Spas Genov (born 24 May 1981) is a Bulgarian boxer best known to win Silver at welterweight at the Euro 2006.

He beat Kakhaber Zhvania but lost the final to Andrey Balanov.

Professional career
He turned pro in 2008 and won seven bouts.

External links
2006 European Championships Results

1981 births
Living people
Bulgarian male boxers
Welterweight boxers